IPDC Finance Limited (previously known as "Industrial Promotion and Development Company of Bangladesh Limited") is a private sector financial institution of the country. This is a public limited company and listed in both Dhaka Stock Exchange and Chittagong Stock Exchange. Established in 1981, IPDC is the first private sector financial institution of the country. The company's products and services ranges from corporate finance and advisory services in corporate sector, middle market supply chain finance in SME sector to retail wealth management and retail finances in retail sector. The company is headquartered in Dhaka and has operations in Chittagong, Sylhet, Gazipur, Narayanganj, Bogra, Jessore, Mymensingh, Uttara, Dhanmondi and Motijheel.

Corporate background
IPDC Finance was established on November 28, 1981, by a distinguished group of shareholders namely International Finance Corporation (IFC), USA, German Investment and Development Company (DEG), Germany, The Aga Khan Fund for Economic Development (AKFED), Switzerland, Commonwealth Development Corporation (CDC), UK and the Government of Bangladesh. It's a public limited company incorporated in Bangladesh under the Companies Act 1913 (now the Companies Act 1994), listed with the Dhaka and Chittagong Stock Exchange Limited since December 3, 2006. Licensed as Financial Institution under the Financial Institutions Act 1993 on February 7, 1995.

IPDC was first conceived as a result of an IBRD/IFC Industrial Sector mission to Bangladesh in 1978. Subsequently, a detailed feasibility study and strategic policy dialogue among the Government, IFC and other international partners resulted in the establishment of IPDC as an alternative development finance institution in the private sector. The Company in 1981 became the first private sector Development Finance Institution (DFI) in Bangladesh.

Management

Chief Executive Office
At the beginning of 2018, IPDC Finance has reappointed Mominul Islam as its managing director and CEO for the third term. Islam joined IPDC as head of operations in 2006. After working in different positions of the company, he took charge as managing director and CEO in 2011. He had also worked in American Express Bank and Standard Chartered Bank for more than seven years in different roles.

Board of directors
Mr Mohammad Abdul Karim (59) is the Chairman of the Board of IPDC Finance Limited. Along with him, Amin Manekia (56) is Vice Chairman, Salahdin Imam (69), Sameer Ahmad (46), Nasreen Sattar (71), Shameran Abed (35), Md. Hoque (56), Mohammad Rashid (50) and Tamara Abed (42) are the members of the board of directors of IPDC Finance.

Awards and recognition
Received Superbrands award 2018

Philanthropy
IPDC has diverse CSR activities education, well-being, cultural, emergencies, recreation, health, sanitation and environment.

Apon Nibash Briddha Asroy Kendro
Started as an informal arrangement in Ramadan of 2015, the Apon Nibash Briddha Asroy Kendro was set up by Syeda Selina Sheli to give shelter to abandoned, isolated and underprivileged older women in Uttara's Chandpara, Uttarkhan area. IPDC came forward and stood beside Apon Nibash, in an effort to sustain its day to day noble work to help the solitary and underprivileged women of the society.

Porua Library
IPDC made significant donations to establish libraries in 9 schools with the help of Light and Hope for the better education of around 300 underprivileged children. It helps in spreading knowledge and education. A well-stocked library is an asset. By establishing libraries in the underserved areas and distributing books to the children. It also contributes towards encouraging children to build themselves a brighter future and henceforth, serve the community.

References

External links
 

Financial services companies established in 1981
Companies listed on the Dhaka Stock Exchange
Financial services companies of Bangladesh